The thirteenth season of the American fictional drama television series ER first aired on September 21, 2006, and concluded on May 17, 2007. It consists of 23 episodes.

Plot

In the aftermath of the shootout Abby delivers a premature baby while Sam suffers a terrifying ordeal at the hands of her ex-boyfriend. Meanwhile, the show's longest-serving character Kerry Weaver departs when Kovač is forced to make budget cuts which threaten her job. Paramedic Tony Gates returns as the ER's new intern, Kovač is sued for malpractice and is later forced to return to Croatia to care for his father, Abby struggles to adapt to motherhood and Ray is involved in a life-changing accident which turns Neela's world upside down.

Cast

Main cast
 Goran Visnjic as Dr. Luka Kovač, Chief of Emergency Medicine
 Maura Tierney as Dr. Abby Lockhart, Third Year Resident
 Mekhi Phifer as Dr. Greg Pratt, Attending Physician
 Parminder Nagra as Dr. Neela Rasgotra, Surgical Intern
 John Stamos as Dr. Tony Gates, ER Intern (episodes 2–23)
 Linda Cardellini as Nurse Samantha Taggart
 Shane West as Dr. Ray Barnett, Third Year Resident
 Scott Grimes as Dr. Archie Morris, Attending Physician
 Laura Innes as Dr. Kerry Weaver, Attending Physician (episodes 1–13)

Supporting

Doctors and medical students
 Stanley Tucci as Dr. Kevin Moretti, Chief of Emergency Medicine (season finale only)
 Amy Aquino as Dr. Janet Coburn, Chief of Obstetrics
 John Aylward as Dr. Donald Anspaugh, Chief of Staff
 Leland Orser as Dr. Lucien Dubenko, Chief of Surgery
 J. P. Manoux as Dr. Dustin Crenshaw, Surgical Chief Resident
 Gina Ravera as Dr. Bettina DeJesus, Radiologist
 Maury Sterling as Dr. Nelson, Psychiatrist
 Sara Gilbert as Dr. Jane Figler, Second Year Resident
 Busy Philipps as Dr. Hope Bobeck, Intern
 Julia Ling as Mae Lee Park, Medical Student
 Kim Strauss as Dr. Ari, Anesthesiologist
 Malaya Rivera Drew as Katey Alvaro, Medical Student
 Marc Jablon as Dr. Larry Weston, Intern
 Perry Anzilotti as Dr. Ed, Anesthesiologist
 Ethan Hova as Dr. Ken Maser
 Aasif Mandvi as Dr. Manish
 L. Scott Caldwell as Dr. Megan Rabb, Director of Neo-Natology
 Dahlia Salem as Dr. Jessica Albright, Surgical Chief Resident (outgoing)

Nurses
 Deezer D as Nurse Malik McGrath
 Laura Cerón as Nurse Chuny Marquez
 Yvette Freeman as Nurse Haleh Adams
 Lily Mariye as Nurse Lily Jarvik
 Dinah Lenney as Nurse Shirley
 Angel Laketa Moore as Nurse Dawn Archer
 Kip Pardue as Nurse Ben Parker
 Kyle Richards as Nurse Dori Kerns
 Nasim Pedrad as Nurse Suri
 Tane Kawasaki as Nurse Claire
 Mary Heiss as Nurse Mary

Staff, Paramedics and Officers
 Abraham Benrubi as Desk Clerk Jerry Markovic
 Troy Evans as Desk Clerk Frank Martin
 Glenn Plummer as Desk Clerk Timmy Rawlins
 Tara Karsian as Social Worker Liz Dade
 Charlayne Woodard as Angela Gilliam (from Staff Services)
 Emily Wagner as Paramedic Doris Pickman
 Montae Russell as Paramedic Dwight Zadro
 Lyn Alicia Henderson as Paramedic Pamela Olbes
 Michelle C. Bonilla as Paramedic Christine Harms
 Demetrius Navarro as Paramedic Morales
 Brian Lester as Paramedic Brian Dumar
 Louie Liberti as Paramedic Bardelli
 Brendan Patrick Connor as Paramedic Reidy
 Vyto Ruginis as Flight Paramedic Wright
 Christopher Amitrano as Officer Hollis
 Joe Manganiello as Officer Litchman
 Chad McKnight as Officer Wilson
 Bobby Nish as Officer Danny Yau
 Louis Iacoviello as Officer Rovner

Family
 Sally Field as Maggie Wyczenski
 Fred Ward as Eddie Wyczenski
 Sam Jones III as Chaz Pratt, later Paramedic
 Dominic Janes as Alex Taggart
 Garret Dillahunt as Steve Curtis
 Lois Smith as Gracie (Sam's grandmother)
 Paula Malcomson as Meg Riley
 Chloe Greenfield as Sarah Riley
 George Gerdes as Jim Riley
 Deka Beaudine as Helen Riley
 Stacy Keach as Mike Gates
 Rosalee Mayeux as Jacy Barnett
 Andrew Gonzales and Aidan Gonzales as Joe Kovač

Guest stars
 Armand Assante as Richard Elliott
 John Mahoney as Bennett Cray
 Forest Whitaker as Curtis Ames
 Keith David as Pastor Watkins
 Annabella Sciorra	as Diana Moore
 Hassan Johnson as Darnell Thibeaux
 Andy Dick as Tommy Brewer

Production

Crew

Episodes

References

External links 

2006 American television seasons
2007 American television seasons
Iraq War in television
ER (TV series) seasons